Salvia flocculosa is a species of flowering plant in the family Lamiaceae that is native to Ecuador.
Its natural habitat is subtropical or tropical moist montane forests.

References

flocculosa
Flora of Ecuador
Vulnerable plants
Taxonomy articles created by Polbot